Shira is a Bantu language of Gabon.

Maho (2009) considers Bwali to be a closely related language. Bwali does not have an ISO code.

References

Languages of Gabon
Sira languages